The Journal of Risk Model Validation is a bimonthly peer-reviewed academic journal focusing on the implementation and validation of risk models. It was established in 2007 and is published by Incisive Risk Information. The editor-in-chief is Stephen Satchell, (Cambridge University). According to the Journal Citation Reports, the journal has a 2015 impact factor of 0.250

References

External links 
 

Finance journals
Publications established in 2007
Bimonthly journals
English-language journals